Biltema is a Swedish chain of retail stores, specializing in tools, car supplies and leisure products. Founded in 1963 in Linköping, Sweden, Biltema also has stores in Finland, Norway and Denmark. The company is owned privately by founder Sten Åke Lindholm, through Dutch company Biltema BV.

History
In 1963 the company was established under the name "General Partnership Biltema". Their business was mail order sales of automotive parts and accessories. Initially, the company was operated from a small basement in Linköping, Sweden. After a year, the firm expanded their mail-order business with a small shop, also in the same basement.

The policy of buying directly from the manufacturer led to Biltema soon began to look up where the manufacture of the various products were made. In the late 1970s, the company began building strategic sourcing contacts around the world.

In 1976, sales rose, and the company moved to Torvinge near Linköping. The store then expanded to about 2,700 square meters in the early 1980s. In 1983 Biltema opened the first store outside Sweden, in Norway and later to a new store in 1985 in Finland.

References

External links
Biltema Sweden
Biltema Norway
Biltema Finland
Biltema Denmark

Hardware stores
Retail companies of Sweden
Swedish brands
Swedish companies established in 1963
Retail companies established in 1963
Companies based in Gothenburg